Noor Bano is a Pakistani drama serial written by Seema Ghazal and directed by Faheem Burney. It began airing from 19 February 2010 on Hum TV. The drama serial was shot in New York City and Lahore. It has Imran Abbas and Mahnoor Baloch in lead roles.

Plot 
The Noor Bano drama rotates around an orphan girl Noor Bano who lives with her paternal uncle Agha Ji after her parents die in a car accident. After few years Agha Ji forcefully marry her to his son, Murash who is younger than her. Murash is also not interested in marrying Noor and thinks her as his elder sister. But he is forced to marry her because his father promised his dying brother that he will take care of his only daughter for the whole life. However, Murash leaves Pakistan after the Nikah ceremony and never established any intimacy with his wife. When Murash leaves home Noor Bano asks him to marry whom so ever he loves. In New York, he fall in love with his classmate ‘Alvina’ and marries her. After a long time Murash returns to Pakistan with Alvina. Noor Bano talks with Aghaji not to punish Murash. By seeing Murash attracted to Noor Bano Alvina gets jealous and she asks for a baby to Murash and Murash gets angry. After few days Alvina gives a birth to a baby girl. After some days Aghaji passes away and Murash becomes Aghaji. Murash proposes Noor Bano and they spend a night in Noor Bano's room, after which Noor Bano leaves a house and Noor Bano's car and Jewellery are found near the sea shore and all family members believe that Noor Bano has died. Murash and Biji gets upset. After 5 years Alvina gets a call from a school that his son is ill, Alvina asks for the name and she replies that the boy's name is Hamza Murash Ali. Alvina gets shocked and goes to Karachi and live there in Sara's (Murash sister) house. She goes to the school and she is shocked to see Noor Bano with the boy (Hamza Murash Ali). Murash comes to Karachi for some work, he gets a call from a doctor, who is also friend of Noor Bano. He tells Murash that his son (Hamza) has a heart problem and Murash is shocked to know that Noor Bano is alive. He goes to Noor Bano's home and spends time with Hamza and Noor Bano. Alvina misunderstands that Murash lives with Noor Bano when ever he comes to Karachi. When Murash comes to Sara's home, Alvina asks about Noor Bano and she insults her. Murash slaps Alvina and he locks her in room. When it is the time of Hamza's surgery, Murash comes to Hospital and Alvina also gets ill and she is also admitted in same hospital. Biji comes to Karachi to see Alvina and sees Murash, Noor Bano and Hamza. Biji gets shocked and talks with Noor Bano and sees Hamza. Alvina get angry and jealous with Noor Bano. Biji, Sara, Murash, Noor Bano and Alvina comes to haveli (home) where Murash divorces Noor Bano.

Cast
 Mahnoor Baloch as Noor Bano
 Imran Abbas as Agha Murash Ali Khan
 Nadia Hussain as Sarah Khan
 Tooba Siddiqui as Alvina
 Mustafa Qureshi as Agha Murad Ali Khan “Agha Ji”
 Bindiya as Alvina's mother
 Samina Ahmad as Bi Jaan
 Saad Imran as Hamza Ali Khan (Noor Bano & Murash's Son)

International broadcast
Series was telecast in India on Zindagi in 2015 while also aired across MENA on MBC Bollywood in Arabic with the same title.

References

External links
 Noor Bano Facebook

2010 Pakistani television series debuts
2010 Pakistani television series endings
Hum TV original programming
Urdu-language television shows